Houston County is a county located in the southeastern corner of the U.S. state of Alabama. As of the 2020 census the population was 107,202. Its county seat is Dothan, which is located on the border and partially in adjacent Henry County.

Houston County is part of the Dothan, Alabama metropolitan area.

History
Houston County was established on February 9, 1903, from parts of Dale, Geneva, and Henry counties. It was named after George Smith Houston, the 24th Governor of Alabama. This area of the state was historically developed for the pine timber and turpentine industries, as well as cotton plantations. The latter, especially, depended on enslaved African Americans for labor.

Because of this history, African Americans predominated in the population until after the early 20th century, when many migrated to northern and midwestern cities for better economic opportunities and to escape Jim Crow discrimination. They were essentially disenfranchised after the turn of the 20th century because of constitutional amendments and other laws that made voter registration nearly impossible. Many poor whites were disenfranchised at the same time.

Geography
The county is located in the Wiregrass region of southeast Alabama.

Major highways

Adjacent counties
Henry County (north)
Early County, Georgia (east)
Seminole County, Georgia (southeast)
Jackson County, Florida (south)
Geneva County (west)
Dale County (northwest)

Demographics

2000 census
As of the census of 2000, there were 88,787 people, 35,834 households, and 25,119 families living in the county.  The population density was 153 people per square mile (59/km2).  There were 39,571 housing units at an average density of 68 per square mile (26/km2).  The racial makeup of the county was 73.08% White, 24.60% Black or African American, 0.37% Native American, 0.62% Asian, 0.02% Pacific Islander, 0.39% from other races, and 0.92% from two or more races.  1.26% of the population were Hispanic or Latino of any race.

There were 35,834 households, out of which 33.00% had children under the age of 18 living with them, 52.50% were married couples living together, 14.10% had a female householder with no husband present, and 29.90% were non-families. 26.40% of all households were made up of individuals, and 10.10% had someone living alone who was 65 years of age or older.  The average household size was 2.45 and the average family size was 2.95.

In the county, the population was spread out, with 25.90% under the age of 18, 8.20% from 18 to 24, 28.70% from 25 to 44, 23.50% from 45 to 64, and 13.70% who were 65 years of age or older.  The median age was 37 years. For every 100 females, there were 95.0 males.  For every 100 females age 18 and over, there were 86.20 males.

The median income for a household in the county was $34,431, and the median income for a family was $42,437. Males had a median income of $32,092 versus $21,409 for females. The per capita income for the county was $18,759.  About 11.80% of families and 15.00% of the population were below the poverty line, including 21.10% of those under age 18 and 16.30% of those age 65 or over.

2010 census
As of the census of 2010, there were 101,547 people, 40,969 households, and 28,041 families living in the county. The racial makeup of the county was 70.0% White, 25.8% Black or African American, 0.4% Native American, 0.8% Asian, 0.0% Pacific Islander, 1.2% from other races, and 1.7% from two or more races. 2.9% of the population were Hispanic or Latino of any race.

There were 40,969 households, out of which 29.2% had children under the age of 18 living with them, 47.9% were married couples living together, 16.2% had a female householder with no husband present, and 31.6% were non-families. 27.2% of all households were made up of individuals, and 9.7% had someone living alone who was 65 years of age or older. The average household size was 2.44 and the average family size was 2.96.

In the county, the population was spread out, with 24.5% under the age of 18, 8.3% from 18 to 24, 25.7% from 25 to 44, 27.0% from 45 to 64, and 14.5% who were 65 years of age or older.  The median age was 38.5 years. For every 100 females, there were 92.3 males. For every 100 females age 18 and over, there were 92.5 males.

The median income for a household in the county was $41,022, and the median income for a family was $51,741. Males had a median income of $41,021 versus $28,240 for females. The per capita income for the county was $22,725. About 12.7% of families and 16.8% of the population were below the poverty line, including 25.8% of those under age 18 and 11.5% of those age 65 or over.

2020 census

As of the 2020 United States census, there were 107,202 people, 39,761 households, and 25,893 families residing in the county.

Government
, the County Chairman is Brandon Shoupe, while Peter Covert is the Chief Administrative Officer. The County Commission is District 1, Curtis Harvey; District 2, Tracy Adams; District 3, Rickey Herring; and District 4, James Ivey. Donald Valenza serves as Sheriff, Probate Judge is Patrick Davenport, Revenue Commissioner is Starla Moss, and Coroner is Robert Byrd. The county engineer is Barkley Kirkland.

The District Attorney serves as prosecutor for cases in both Houston and Henry counties.

Houston County is located in Alabama's 2nd congressional district; its current Representative is Barry Moore (R).

Houston County is reliably Republican at the presidential level. The last Democrat to win the county in a presidential election was Adlai Stevenson, who won it by a majority in 1956.

Communities

City
Dothan (county seat; partly in Dale County and Henry County)

Towns

Ashford
Avon
Columbia
Cottonwood
Cowarts
Gordon
Kinsey
Madrid
Rehobeth
Taylor (partly in Geneva County)
Webb

Unincorporated communities

Ardilla
Big Creek
Crosby
Grangeburg
Love Hill
Lucy
Pansey
Peterman
Pleasant Plains
Wicksburg

See also
National Register of Historic Places listings in Houston County, Alabama
Properties on the Alabama Register of Landmarks and Heritage in Houston County, Alabama

References

External links
Houston County web site

 

 
Dothan metropolitan area, Alabama
1903 establishments in Alabama